Carlos van der Maath (born 24 May 1946) is an Argentine former swimmer. He competed at the 1964 Summer Olympics and the 1968 Summer Olympics.

References

1946 births
Living people
Argentine male swimmers
Olympic swimmers of Argentina
Swimmers at the 1964 Summer Olympics
Swimmers at the 1968 Summer Olympics
Swimmers at the 1963 Pan American Games
Pan American Games silver medalists for Argentina
Pan American Games medalists in swimming
Swimmers from Buenos Aires
Medalists at the 1963 Pan American Games
Medalists at the 1967 Pan American Games
20th-century Argentine people